Ancient Airs and Dances is a set of three orchestral suites by Italian composer Ottorino Respighi, freely transcribed from original pieces for lute. In addition to being a renowned composer and conductor, Respighi was also a notable musicologist. His interest in Italian music of the 16th, 17th, and 18th centuries led him to compose works inspired by the music of these periods.

Suite No. 1 (1917)

Suite No. 1 P 109 was composed in 1917. It was based on Renaissance lute pieces by Simone Molinaro, Vincenzo Galilei (father of Galileo Galilei) and additional anonymous composers.

The orchestration calls for 2 flutes, 2 oboes, English horn, 2 bassoons, 2 horns in F, trumpet in D, harp, harpsichord and strings.

Suite No. 2 (1923)
Suite No. 2, P 138 was composed in 1923. It was based on pieces for lute, archlute, and viol by Fabritio Caroso, Jean-Baptiste Besard, Bernardo Gianoncelli, and an anonymous composer. It also includes an aria attributed to Marin Mersenne.

The orchestration calls for an average-sized  orchestra of 3 flutes (3rd doubling piccolo), 2 oboes, English horn, 2 clarinets in A/B♭, 2 bassoons, 3 horns in D (doubling 2 horns in E/F), 2 trumpets in A/D (doubling trumpet in C), 3 trombones, 3 timpani, celesta, harpsichord 4-hands, harp and strings.

Suite No. 3 (1931)
Suite No. 3, P 172 was composed in 1931. It differs from the previous two suites in that it is arranged for strings only and somewhat melancholy in overall mood. (A note by the composer in the printed score states that the work may also be performed by a string quartet, completely omitting the double-bass part.) It is based on lute songs by Besard, a piece for Baroque guitar by Ludovico Roncalli, and lute pieces by Santino Garsi da Parma and additional anonymous composers.

Transcriptions
The Ancient Airs and Dances first two suites were freely transcribed by the composer for piano (2 and 4 hands). In 2016, Dennis Janzer transcribed the set for the organ.

Recordings

There have been many recordings of the suites in their entirety, and individually, with Suite No. 3 most frequently appearing alone. Recordings include:
Philharmonia Hungarica, Antal Dorati (Mercury)
Boston Symphony Orchestra, Seiji Ozawa (DG)
Los Angeles Chamber Orchestra, Sir Neville Marriner (EMI)
Lausanne Chamber Orchestra, Jesús López-Cobos (Telarc)
Saint Paul Chamber Orchestra, Hugh Wolff (Teldec)
Australian Chamber Orchestra, Christopher Lyndon-Gee (Omega)
Sinfonia 21, Richard Hickox (Chandos)
Orpheus Chamber Orchestra (1 & 3 only) (DG)
Rome Symphony Orchestra, Francesco La Vecchia
Orchestre Philharmonique de Liège, John Neschling (BIS)
In 1987 Paul O'Dette released a recording of the original lute songs and dances on which Respighi based the suites.

Suite No. 3 only
Berliner Philharmoniker, Herbert von Karajan (DG)
I Musici
 I Solisti Italiani
Academy of St. Martin-in-the-Fields, Sir Neville Marriner (Philips)
English String Orchestra, William Boughton (Nimbus)

References

External links
 

Compositions by Ottorino Respighi
1917 compositions
1923 compositions
1931 compositions
Orchestral suites
Compositions for symphony orchestra
Compositions for string orchestra